Kelvin Claudius Williams (born 29 May 1959 in Carapichaima, Trinidad) is a former cricketer and current head coach of Trinidad and Tobago, a team he represented throughout his playing career.

References

1959 births
Living people
Trinidad and Tobago cricketers
Marylebone Cricket Club cricketers
Northumberland cricketers
Trinidad and Tobago cricket coaches